Project MUSE, a non-profit collaboration between libraries and publishers, is an online database of peer-reviewed academic journals and electronic books. Project MUSE contains digital humanities and social science content from over 250 university presses and scholarly societies around the world. It is an aggregator of digital versions of academic journals, all of which are free of digital rights management (DRM). It operates as a third-party acquisition service like EBSCO, JSTOR,  OverDrive, and ProQuest.

MUSE's online journal collections are available on a subscription basis to academic, public, special, and school libraries. Currently, more than 2,500 libraries worldwide subscribe. Electronic book collections became available for institutional purchase in January 2012. Thousands of scholarly books are available on the platform.

History
Project MUSE was founded in 1993 as a joint project between the Johns Hopkins University Press and the Milton S. Eisenhower Library at the Johns Hopkins University.  With grants from the Andrew W. Mellon Foundation and the National Endowment for the Humanities, Project MUSE was launched online alongside the JHU Press Journals in 1995.  Beginning in 2000, journals from other scholarly publishers were integrated into MUSE's online collections.  Additional publishers have added journals each subsequent year. In January 2012, a new interface was launched which incorporated its current journal collection with electronic books published by members of the University Press Content Consortium (UPCC).

The platform is powered by the WAIS searching utility called SWISH (Simple Web Indexing System for Humans), which allows Boolean searching in single issues, volumes, or across all 40+ titles. In cases where footnotes exist in articles, the footnote number is presented as a hyperlink to the article's bibliography or notes section.

Journals
Project MUSE offers tiered-pricing structures to meet budgetary and research needs of subscribing institutions.

Subscribers may choose from four interdisciplinary journal collections, as well as two broad discipline collections in the humanities or social sciences.  Content is grouped into seventeen interdisciplinary research areas: Area and Ethnic Studies; Art and Architecture; Creative Writing; Education; Film, Theater, and Performing Arts; History; Language and Linguistics; Library Science and Publishing; Literature; Medicine and Health; Music; Philosophy; Religion; Science, Technology, and Mathematics; Social Sciences; Studies by Time Period; Women's Studies, Gender, and Sexuality.

Project MUSE is the sole source of full-text versions of journal titles from a number of university presses and scholarly societies.  Journals are published electronically at the same time as their print counterparts and remain available permanently within the database.  Subscribing libraries are not required to maintain a print subscription to the same journals they access through Project MUSE.  Although much of the journal content consists of current publications, archival issues of many of its journals are regularly added to the database.  More than 800 journals from over 250 university presses and scholarly publishers are available. Of the 800+ journals in the database, more than 100 of them include complete runs.

A number of resources are provided including tutorials, instructional materials, and subject guides.  End-users have the capability to search the database and, if affiliated with a subscribing institution, immediately retrieve content in 100% full-text PDF or HTML formats.  The complete content of each journal is available in the database, including all charts, graphics, and images.  MUSE supports various research and discovery tools such as social bookmarking, citation management functions, and RSS feeds. Subscription licenses allow unlimited simultaneous access to its content, as well as the ability to retrieve content through interlibrary loan.

Books
Supported by two grants from the Andrew W. Mellon Foundation, The University Press e-book Consortium (UPeC) emerged in 2009 to explore the feasibility of, and later develop, a university press-based e-book initiative that would balance the interests of both the publishing and library communities. In Spring 2011, UPeC announced its partnership with Project MUSE, and the University Press Content Consortium (UPCC) Book Collections on Project MUSE was established.  Launched in January 2012, the UPCC Book Collections consist of thousands of peer-reviewed book titles from major university presses and related scholarly publishers.  Book collections are fully integrated with MUSE's electronic journal collections, allowing users to search across books and journals simultaneously or limit searches by content type. In 2016, it launched an initiative to create an open access platform that also digitized out-of-print scholarly books under the effort called MUSE Open.

All content from the print editions of the electronic books are full-text, accessible in PDF format, and fully searchable and retrievable at the chapter level.  No Digital Rights Management (DRM) are attached, allowing users to print, copy, download, and save content. Books available in the collections contain current publications that are released simultaneously as their print versions.

The UPCC Book Collections on Project MUSE include a range of current humanities and social science scholarly titles.  Books are available for purchase by publication date or through fourteen subject-based collections: Archaeology and Anthropology; Ecology and Evolution; Classical Studies; Film, Theater, and Performing Arts; Global Cultural Studies; Higher Education; History; Language and Linguistics; Literature; Philosophy and Religion; Psychology; Poetry, Fiction, and Creative Non-Fiction; Political Science and Policy Studies; United States Regional Studies. Additionally, eight Area Studies Collections are available: African, American, Asian and Pacific, Jewish, Latin American and Caribbean, Middle Eastern, Native American and Indigenous, and Russian and East European.

Two subscription options that provide access only (no ownership) are available to institutions. The Current Subscription provides access to all UPCC books in MUSE published or due to be published in the current year or prior two years; the Archival Subscription provides access to all UPCC books published more than three years prior.

In November 2012, Project MUSE and YBP Library Services formed a partnership to sell single book titles from the University Press Content Consortium (UPCC) on the MUSE platform.

See also

 Aluka
 ARTstor
 ArXiv
 Digital preservation
 Japanese Historical Text Initiative
 List of academic databases and search engines

References

External links
 

Johns Hopkins University
Aggregation-based digital libraries
Academic publishing
Full-text scholarly online databases
Academic journal online publishing platforms
American digital libraries